= Guyana Education Access Project =

The Guyana Education Access project was a five-year Government of Guyana project (January 1999 to December 2003), funded by the United Kingdom Department for International Development (DFID) and managed by CfBT.

The main project goal of GEAP supported the Ministry of Education's mission by aiming to provide sustainable improvement in education quality and access for all children in Guyana, particularly the poorest.
